KBC Band (also sometimes referred to as The Kantner Balin Casady Band) was formed in 1985 by former Jefferson Airplane (later Jefferson Starship) members Paul Kantner (guitar and vocals), Marty Balin (vocals and guitar) and Jack Casady (bass). Other members included Keith Crossan (saxophone, guitar and vocals), Tim Gorman (keyboards and vocals), Slick Aguilar (guitar and vocals) and Darrell Verdusco (drums). Their sole LP, KBC Band, featured the singles "America" and "It's Not You, It's Not Me."

The band performed supporting tours from 1985 to 1987 before Kantner left for Nicaragua to investigate the Sandinista situation. The band did not perform after his return. Kantner said that Balin was becoming "difficult" near the end of KBC's existence. However, Kantner and Casady continued to perform onstage together during Hot Tuna concerts in late 1987 and early 1988, and the three reunited with Grace Slick and Jorma Kaukonen for a Jefferson Airplane reunion album and a reunion tour in 1989, along with Tim Gorman on keyboards for the tour. The album included three songs that had been performed by KBC Band: "Planes", "Solidarity" and "Summer of Love". They had also performed "Let's Go", which was considered for but rejected from that album.

In 1992, Kantner, Casady, Aguilar, and Gorman reformed Jefferson Starship. Balin would also eventually rejoin them in 1993. All members of KBC Band except for Verdusco and Crossan participated in the recording of Deep Space/Virgin Sky and Windows of Heaven. Verdusco has been a member of Starship featuring Mickey Thomas since 1995.

Personnel
Slick Aguilar - guitar, vocals
Marty Balin - vocals, guitar (died 2018)
Jack Casady - bass
Keith Crossan - saxophone, guitar, vocals
Tim Gorman - keyboards, vocals
Paul Kantner - guitar, vocals (died 2016)
Darrell Verdusco - drums

References

Citations

Rock music groups from California
Musical groups established in 1985
Musical groups disestablished in 1987
Musical groups from San Francisco
1985 establishments in California
1987 disestablishments in California
Jefferson Airplane